Siriki Sanogo (born 21 December 2001) is an Ivorian professional footballer who plays as a midfielder for Italian  club Benevento.

Club career
Sanogo joined the Benevento Calcio youth academy in February from USD San Nicola on 10 February 2017. He made his debut for Benevento in a 1–0 Serie A win over Genoa on 12 May 2018.

On 17 January 2022, his loan to Pescara was terminated early. On 16 February 2022, Sanogo was loaned by Schaffhausen in Switzerland.

References

External links
 
 
 Siriky Sanogo at Serie A
 Benevento Profile

2001 births
Living people
People from Bingerville
Ivorian footballers
Benevento Calcio players
Delfino Pescara 1936 players
FC Schaffhausen players
Serie A players
Serie B players
Swiss Challenge League players
Association football forwards
Ivorian expatriate footballers
Ivorian expatriate sportspeople in Italy
Expatriate footballers in Italy
Ivorian expatriate sportspeople in Switzerland
Expatriate footballers in Switzerland